Jarallah Ali Al-Marri (Arabic جار الله المري; born 3 April 1988, in Ar-Rayyan) is a Qatari footballer. He currently plays as a striker .

Career
Al Marri played for Qatar at the 2005 FIFA U-17 World Championship in Peru.

International goals
Scores and results list Qatar's goal tally first.

References

External links
Goalzz.com profile

1988 births
Living people
Qatari footballers
Al Kharaitiyat SC players
2011 AFC Asian Cup players
Qatar Stars League players
Qatar international footballers
Al-Rayyan SC players
Footballers at the 2010 Asian Games
Al-Sailiya SC players
Qatari Second Division players
Association football forwards
Asian Games competitors for Qatar